Hands of a Murderer is a 1990 British made-for-television mystery film directed by Stuart Orme, starring Edward Woodward as Sherlock Holmes and John Hillerman as Dr. John H. Watson.

Production
Filmed in England in association with Yorkshire Television, the film premiered on CBS on 16 May 1990.

The screenplay was written by Charles Edward Pogue who had penned the earlier Ian Richardson Sherlock Holmes films, The Sign of Four and The Hound of the Baskervilles and was initially intended to be a part of that series of films.

Cast 
Edward Woodward as Sherlock Holmes
John Hillerman as Dr. John H. Watson
Anthony Andrews as Professor Moriarty
Kim Thomson as Sophie DeVere
Peter Jeffrey as Mycroft Holmes
Warren Clarke as Col. Gould
Terence Lodge as Inspector Lestrade

Reception
Reviews for the film were decidedly mixed. People gave the film a B review in its "picks and pans" column. Matthew E. Bunson in his Encyclopedia Sherlockiana opined "this is a surprisingly disappointing production despite the best efforts of all concerned and lavish attention to detail." Alan Barnes in Sherlock Holmes on Screen wrote that the film "is no more than a number of high-concept set-pieces linked by the flimsiest of stories."

References

External links 

1990 television films
1990 films
1990s mystery films
Sherlock Holmes films based on works by Arthur Conan Doyle
British television films
British mystery films
Films scored by Colin Towns
CBS network films
Films with screenplays by Charles Edward Pogue
1990s British films